Route 199, or Highway 199, may refer to:

Canada
 Quebec Route 199

Chile
Route 199-CH in Araucanía Region

Japan
 Japan National Route 199

United States
 U.S. Route 199
 Alabama State Route 199
 California State Route 199
 Connecticut Route 199
 Georgia State Route 199
 Illinois Route 199 (former)
 Iowa Highway 199 (former)
 K-199 (Kansas highway)
 Kentucky Route 199
 Maine State Route 199
 M-199 (Michigan highway)
 New York State Route 199
 Ohio State Route 199
 Oklahoma State Highway 199
 Pennsylvania Route 199
 Tennessee State Route 199
 Texas State Highway 199
Texas State Highway Spur 199
 Farm to Market Road 199
 Utah State Route 199
 Virginia State Route 199
Wisconsin Highway 199 (former)

Territories:
 Puerto Rico Highway 199